Peter Loehr is an American film producer and executive who spent the bulk of his career in Asia. He was the chief executive officer of Legendary East, a Beijing-based division of Legendary Entertainment from 2012 to 2017. Loehr first arrived in China in 1996 and founded Imar Film Company in collaboration with Xian Film Studio in 1997. Spicy Love Soup was the first film produced by Loehr, the film grossed over $2.8 million and he later produced A Beautiful New World and Shower. Before arriving in China, he had worked in Japan as a legal assistant and was offered a job by Amuse Inc. in Taiwan's entertainment industry and became its international department's vice head. Loehr produced The Great Wall, a Chinese American film released in 2016 that grossed $170 million, while working for Legendary Entertainment. He later stepped down as the chief executive officer of Legendary East in May 2017.

References

American film producers
Chinese film producers
Living people
Year of birth missing (living people)